Ethelton station is located on the Outer Harbor line. Situated in the north-western Adelaide suburb of Ethelton, it is 13.1 kilometres from Adelaide station.

History
Ethelton station opened in 1916, following construction of the Commercial Road viaduct at Port Adelaide and a new bridge across the Port River. This new line diverted trains from Adelaide to Semaphore and Outer Harbor away from the congested rail yards at Port Dock station and to avoid heavy traffic along St Vincents Street in the centre of Port Adelaide. It has been unstaffed since the ticket office closed in 1980, and there is a small interchange for local buses adjacent to the station.

The railway tracks through Ethelton are dual gauge and capable of carrying both  broad gauge and  trains. Until July 2008, the dual gauge tracks were used by freight trains from Dry Creek and the Rosewater loop which passed through Ethelton to access industrial facilities on the Lefevre Peninsula and the container terminal at Pelican Point. All freight services through the station ceased when the new Mary Mackillop Bridge opened. The disused standard gauge rails have been removed, however the dual gauge sleepers remain in place.

Sections of the platform were replaced in 2014, and the station's seating and shelters were replaced in 2017.

Services by platform

References

 Rails Through Swamp and Sand – A History of the Port Adelaide Railway.  M. Thompson pub. Port Dock Station Railway Museum (1988)

External links

Railway stations in Adelaide
Railway stations in Australia opened in 1916
Lefevre Peninsula